Ioana Laura Pristăviță (née Oltean; born 20 July 1989) is a Romanian female handballer who plays for Gloria Bistrița and the Romanian national team.

She was provisionally selected for the 2014 European Women's Handball Championship but she didn't make the squad in the end because of an injury.

Achievements
Liga Naţională:
Winner: 2014  
Silver Medalist: 2010, 2011, 2012, 2013, 2015
Bronze Medalist: 2010, 2011, 2012, 2013, 2019
Cupa României:
Winner: 2013, 2014, 2015
Supercupa României:
Winner: 2013, 2014
European Junior Handball Championship:
Bronze Medalist: 2007

References

External links

1989 births
Living people
Sportspeople from Bistrița
Romanian female handball players
CS Minaur Baia Mare (women's handball) players
21st-century Romanian women